Lincoln County is a county in the U.S. state of West Virginia. As of the 2020 census, the population was 20,463. Its county seat is Hamlin. The county was created in 1867 and named for Abraham Lincoln.

Lincoln County is part of the Huntington-Ashland, WV-KY-OH Metropolitan Statistical Area.

History
Lincoln County was created by an act of the West Virginia Legislature on February 23, 1867, from parts of Boone, Cabell, Kanawha and Putnam counties. By 1869, the county had returned much of its Putnam County territory and absorbed the northern portion of Logan County and a portion of Wayne County. In 1869, Harts Creek Township (later district) was created from this latter region. Lincoln County is one of five counties created by West Virginia since the Civil War. Hamlin, seat of government for the county, was established in 1853.

Jesse, John, David, William, and Moses McComas were the first Anglo settlers in what is now Lincoln County. They cultivated  of corn, the first ever grown in the area near present-day West Hamlin, in 1799. Later that year, they returned to eastern Virginia to get their families. Their families were initially left behind because it was not known if there were any hostile Native Americans in the area, or if the soil would be suitable for cultivation. John Lucas, William Hinch, and John Johnson soon joined the McComases in the county. They built cabins in the county around 1800. About 1804, William Wirt Brumfield settled at the mouth of Big Ugly Creek.

Based on military enlistments, Lincoln County appears to have been evenly divided in its sympathies during the Civil War. The county hosted a handful of small skirmishes, mostly centered on Mud River.

After the war, timbering constituted the county's primary industry. The county also became nationally known for its tobacco cultivation. In the early twentieth century, the county experienced a gas boom.

In 1863, West Virginia's counties were divided into civil townships, with the intention of encouraging local government.  This proved impractical in the heavily rural state, and in 1872 the townships were converted into magisterial districts.  Between its formation in 1867 and 1870, Lincoln County was divided into seven townships: Carroll, Duval, Harts Creek, Jefferson, Sheridan, Union, and Washington.  In 1871, Laurel Hill Township was formed from portions of Harts Creek and Sheridan Townships.  The following year, the eight townships became magisterial districts.  Except for minor adjustments, the eight historic magisterial districts remained largely unchanged until the twenty-first century, when they were consolidated into three new districts: District 1, District 2, and District 3.

Geography

Major highways
 U.S. Highway 119
 West Virginia Route 3
 West Virginia Route 10
 West Virginia Route 34
 West Virginia Route 37
 West Virginia Route 214

Adjacent counties
Putnam County (north)
Kanawha County (northeast)
Boone County (southeast)
Logan County (south)
Mingo County (southwest)
Wayne County (west)
Cabell County (northwest)

Demographics

2000 census
As of the census of 2000, there were 22,108 people, 8,664 households, and 6,532 families living in the county. There were 9,846 housing units at an average density of 22 per square mile (9/km2). The racial makeup of the county was 99.04% White, 0.06% Black or African American, 0.17% Native American, 0.06% Asian, 0.01% Pacific Islander, 0.06% from other races, and 0.61% from two or more races.  0.55% of the population were Hispanic or Latino of any race.

There were 8,664 households, out of which 33.00% had children under the age of 18 living with them, 60.40% were married couples living together, 10.80% had a female householder with no husband present, and 24.60% were non-families. 22.20% of all households were made up of individuals, and 10.40% had someone living alone who was 65 years of age or older.  The average household size was 2.54 and the average family size was 2.94.

In the county, the population was spread out, with 23.60% under the age of 18, 9.30% from 18 to 24, 29.10% from 25 to 44, 24.90% from 45 to 64, and 13.10% who were 65 years of age or older.  The median age was 37 years. For every 100 females there were 97.20 males.  For every 100 females age 18 and over, there were 96.00 males.

The median income for a household in the county was $22,662, and the median income for a family was $28,297. Males had a median income of $30,810 versus $18,270 for females. The per capita income for the county was $13,073.  About 22.80% of families and 27.90% of the population were below the poverty line, including 37.60% of those under age 18 and 20.80% of those age 65 or over.

2010 census
As of the 2010 United States census, there were 21,720 people, 8,783 households, and 6,268 families living in the county. The racial makeup of the county was 99.0% white, 0.1% Asian, 0.1% American Indian, 0.1% black or African American, 0.1% from other races, and 0.6% from two or more races. Those of Hispanic or Latino origin made up 0.4% of the population. In terms of ancestry, 27.0% were American, 12.8% were Irish, 12.4% were English, and 12.4% were German.

Of the 8,783 households, 32.3% had children under the age of 18 living with them, 55.3% were married couples living together, 10.7% had a female householder with no husband present, 28.6% were non-families, and 25.6% of all households were made up of individuals. The average household size was 2.47 and the average family size was 2.92. The median age was 41.2 years.

The median income for a household in the county was $30,868 and the median income for a family was $37,667. Males had a median income of $43,662 versus $23,166 for females. The per capita income for the county was $16,439. About 22.8% of families and 26.6% of the population were below the poverty line, including 37.7% of those under age 18 and 13.2% of those age 65 or over.

Politics
As like the rest of West Virginia, Lincoln county was solidly Democratic up until the 2000s. After they took a massive shift towards the GOP, the last Democratic candidate to carry Lincoln County was Al Gore in 2000.

Communities

Towns
Hamlin (county seat)
West Hamlin

Magisterial districts

Current
District 1
District 2
District 3

Historic
Carroll
Duval
Harts Creek
Jefferson
Laurel Hill
Sheridan
Union
Washington

Census-designated places
Alum Creek (part)
Harts

Unincorporated communities

Atenville
Branchland
Eden Park
Ferrellsburg
Fourteen
Gill
Green Shoal
Griffithsville
Leet
Midkiff
Myra
Pleasant View
Ranger
Rector
Sod
Sweetland
Toney
Warren
Wewanta
Yawkey

Notable people
 Dagmar, actress
 Lloyd G. Jackson, politician
 Clark Kessinger, fiddler
 Clark W. May, politician
 J. S. Pridemore, oil industrialist
Johnny Sias, professional disc golfer and PDGA World Champion
 Russ Thomas, professional football player
 John S. Witcher, Civil War senior officer
 Chuck Yeager, aviator

See also
Big Ugly Wildlife Management Area
National Register of Historic Places listings in Lincoln County, West Virginia

Footnotes

References

External links
Lincoln County Portal